The 1977–78 Toronto Maple Leafs season was the 61st season of the franchise, 51st as the Maple Leafs. The Leafs made the playoffs and won two series before losing the semi-finals to the Montreal Canadiens.

Offseason

NHL Draft

Regular season
Darryl Sittler ranked third in the NHL in scoring with 117 points.

Final standings

Schedule and results

Playoffs
 Won Preliminary Round (2–0) versus Los Angeles Kings
 Won Quarter-Finals (4–3) versus New York Islanders
 Lost Semi-Finals (4–0) versus Montreal Canadiens

Player statistics

Regular season
Scoring

Goaltending

Playoffs
Scoring

Goaltending

Transactions
The Maple Leafs have been involved in the following transactions during the 1977–78 season.

Trades

Waivers

Free agents

Awards and records
 Borje Salming, Molson Cup (most game star selections for Toronto Maple Leafs)
 Borje Salming, NHL 2nd All-Star Team
 Darryl Sittler, NHL 2nd All-Star Team

Farm teams

References
 Maple Leafs on Hockey Database

Toronto Maple Leafs seasons
Toronto
Toronto